The Virtual Soldier Research program (VSR) is a research group within the University of Iowa  Center for Computer-Aided Design (CCAD). VSR was founded by Professor Karim Abdel-Malek in 2003 through external funding from the US Army Tank Automotive Command (TACOM) to put the Warfighter at the center of US Army product designs. Professor Abdel-Malek's background in robotics and the use of rigorous mathematical formulations was the first introduction of mathematical kinematics to the field of Digital Human Modeling (DHM).  Prior to 2003, all DHM models were based on experimental data that use lookup tables to enable the posturing of simple mannequins. Indeed, the first version of Santos, presented at the a DHM conference was met with great success because it was the first fully articulated digital human model that behaved as humans do, whereby joints had constraints (also called ranges of motion) and a user could pull on an arm for example and as a result the entire body would respond accordingly.  Cost functions representing human performance measures were used to drive the motion within the optimization formulation. Seated posture prediction for example was accomplished by simply providing the seat geometry. The posture prediction methodology was subsequently validated  Later on, the Predictive Dynamics method was created and used the same optimization technique with the addition of 3D laws of motion (equations of motion).  The Santos system includes many aspects of physiology modeling, thermal, hand model, grasp prediction, gait analysis including stability, mobility, suitability, survivability, maintainability, training, and many other metrics typically used in the assessment of human performance for the Warfighter.

Using this initial research and funding as a foundation, the VSR program continues to develop new technologies in digital human modeling and simulation, specifically with applications for the military, automotive, manufacturing, athletics, injury prediction, With over $60M in funding, the Santos simulation platform provides two key components that differentiates it among all other DHM systems: (1) Physics based and (2) Predicts behavior.

VSR's digital human model, Santos (R), stands at the center of its digital human modeling and simulation research. The high-fidelity, biomechanically and biofidelic accurate musculoskeletal model incorporates 215 degrees of freedom, including the hand, feet, and eyes. The dimensions of the skeleton are mutable, able to represent any anthropometric cross section. In addition, Santos includes a muscular system with the ability to predict muscle activation and muscle forces in real time, using a novel optimization-based methodology. This method, developed over a period of eight years by the Virtual Soldier Research program is called Predictive Dynamics and published by a book and a large number of papers.   Furthermore, the gradient based methodology used to solve for the motion was also replaced with an artificial intelligence neural network method.

The mathematical model for the Santos skeleton was developed based on the Denavit-Hartenberg method for kinematic and dynamic analysis. Optimization is used to determine postures and motions that are governed by various human performance measures (objective functions) and constrained by the restrictions imposed by the skeleton, the laws of physics, and the environment. The Santos simulation platform is being used by the US Military, industry (for example automotive industry), and academia.  The Virtual Soldier Research team transitioned a product from the Santos environment called Enhanced Technologies for the Optimization of Warfighter Load (ETOWL) funded by the Office of Naval Research (ONR) to the US Marines. The product was later renamed as GruntSim.   This human modeling and simulation environment is now being used to  study human factors and ergonomics in many applications.  This model includes not only Predictive Dynamics but also stability criteria called Zero Moment Point.  The use of the Santos Digital Human Model for example in assessing assembly issues in the design stage have been demonstrated and for gait prediction as well.  Running for example, which substantially more difficult to predict for a virtual human, was accomplished.

The Santos simulation platform was developed from the ground up.  Using the 215 DOF and based on the use of optimization based methods that enable cost functions to drive the motion, the numerical algorithm drives the motion to predict joint variables across time (also called joint profiles) and subject to a number of constraints.  For example, predicting gait of any body type is now possible.  Similarly, any task can be modeled and simulated using this approach. Xiang, Yujiang, Jasbir S. Arora, and Karim Abdel-Malek. "Hybrid predictive dynamics: a new approach to simulate human motion." Multibody System Dynamics 28.3 (2012): 199-224.

The Santos system was also used to predict injury for various activities, particularly musculoskeletal injuries in athletics, military, manufacturing, and other domains.

VSR research has led to the spin-off of a private company, Santos Human Inc., specifically focused on product development.

Who is Santos™?

Santos is the only physics-based virtual human that stands at the center of the digital human modeling and simulation research at the University of Iowa and in use by the US Army and the US Marines. This high-fidelity, biofidelic, biomechanically and physiologically accurate musculoskeletal model was developed from the inside out by a large multidisciplinary team, and incorporates 215 degrees of freedom, including the hand, feet, and eyes. The dimensions of the skeleton are mutable, able to represent any anthropometric cross section. In addition, Santos includes a muscular system with the ability to predict muscle activation and muscle forces in real time, using a novel optimization-based methodology.  The Santos system has been used in many applications.

Over time, the Santos family has grown to incorporate a variety of different body scans to provide a range of models that include our female version, Sophia, and a broad array of different body shapes, types, and sizes. Our research is currently being extended to allow multiple digital human models to interact with each other to complete tasks cooperatively.

Santos was built using state-of-the-art technologies adapted from robotics, Hollywood, and the game industry. VSR research continues to grow in its dynamic capabilities, physiology, and intelligent behaviors through integration of Artificial Intelligence, design optimization, physics-based modeling, and advanced, multi-scale physiological models.

The mathematical model for the Santos skeleton was developed based on the Denavit-Hartenberg method for kinematic and dynamic analysis. Optimization is used to determine postures and motions that are governed by various human performance measures (objective functions) and constrained by the restrictions imposed by the skeleton, the laws of physics, and the environment. The software must be as fast and efficient as possible in an effort to provide real-time simulations.

References 

Anatomical simulation
University of Iowa
2003 establishments in Iowa